The 1982 South Australian Open was a men's Grand Prix tennis circuit tournament held in Adelaide, Australia that took place from 20 December until 28 December 1982. It was the 80th edition of the tournament and was played on outdoor grass courts. Unseeded Mike Bauer won the singles title.

Finals

Singles

 Mike Bauer defeated  Chris Johnstone 4–6, 7–6, 6–2
 It was Bauer's 3rd title of the year and the 5th of his career.

Doubles

 Pat Cash /  Chris Johnstone defeated  Broderick Dyke /  Wayne Hampson 6–3, 6–7, 7–6
 It was Cash's 2nd title of the year and the 2nd of his career. It was Johnstone's only title of the year and the 1st of his career.

References

External links
 ATP tournament profile
 ITF tournament edition details

 

 
South Australian Open
South Australian Open, 1982
South Australian Open
South Australian Open